Claude Valentine Duncan (4 May 1884 – 20 May 1960) was an Australian rules footballer who played with Fitzroy in the Victorian Football League (VFL).

Notes

External links 

1884 births
1960 deaths
Australian rules footballers from Victoria (Australia)
Fitzroy Football Club players